Gluhota is a novel by Slovenian author Jože Hudeček. It was first published in 2001. In 2002, it was nominated for Kresnik Award, the award for best novel of the year in Slovenia.

References

Slovenian novels
2001 novels